Salt Springs is an unincorporated community in Marion County, Florida, United States. It is located near Lake George. The community is part of the Ocala Metropolitan Statistical Area. Salt Springs is seated among the Ocala National Forest.

Salt Springs offers plenty of activities for the family including fishing, camping, biking and hiking. The neighboring body of water known as Lake Kerr is also a place to enjoy a variety of water sports. Just inside the town limits is "Bass Champions," a seafood/country cooking restaurant that has become a favorite of locals as well as those from other parts of the state. The main attraction is the Salt Springs Recreation and Camping areas. The recreation area is home to the Salt Springs, with clear water that is 72°F year round. The springs are full of bass, turtles, and blue crabs. Although alligators inhabit the area, the swimming hole is safe and free from these predators during the day. The springs boast 4 inch boils which you can swim into, the deepest being 6 fathoms (36 ft deep). This spring feeds into Lake George.

The main roads through Salt Springs are State Road 19, as well as County Road 314 and County Road 316, both of which terminate at SR 19.

A fatal alligator attack took place seven miles south of Salt Springs on May 14, 2006. A 23-year-old Florida woman was killed by an alligator while snorkeling at a lakeside recreation area.

See also

References

External links

 Ocala/Marion Visitors' & Convention Bureau
 Salt Springs Florida
 Kayaking Salt Springs

Unincorporated communities in Marion County, Florida
Springs of Florida
Unincorporated communities in Florida
Bodies of water of Marion County, Florida